Meet Your Maker is an upcoming first-person shooter video game developed and published by Behaviour Interactive. In the game, players are tasked to build and raid user-generated outposts filled with traps and guards. The game is set to be released for Windows PC, PlayStation 4, PlayStation 5, Xbox One and Xbox Series X and Series S in April 2023.

Gameplay

Meet Your Maker is set in a post-apocalyptic world in which players must construct an outpost and infiltrate those created by other players. The infiltrating player must grab "GenMat", genetic materials that are found in the center of each outpost, and escape the outpost with it. Players can raid an outpost solo or with another player. Players are equipped with a variety of firearms, grenades, a grappling hook and a melee weapon. Players are encouraged to leave words of recognition that describe their experience after raiding an outpost.

In the creation mode, players must create a path for other players to reach the GenMat, and a harvester robot will inform them if GenMat is accessible. They can then fortify the path with a variety of traps, as well as guards controlled by artificial intelligence to fend off other infiltrating players. Once the construction is completed, players can test and share their creations with other players online. They can further iterated its design by watching how other players attempt to raid it.  Both building and raiding outposts will grant players resources that allow them to further upgrade their traps and weapons in their own outposts.

Development
Meet Your Maker was developed by Behaviour Interactive, the developers behind Dead by Daylight. Early previews compared the game to Doom, Super Mario Maker and Minecraft. To ensure that the game is balanced, there is a maximum build capacity for each outpost, though this limit can be further increased through upgrades. The game was playable in first-person perspective as the team felt that it highlights the claustrophobic setting, making the experience more immersive. Traps in the game cannot fire at players until they are identified, thus giving time for the invading players to react.

The game was officially announced in August 2022. An open beta for the game was released from February 7 to February 13, 2023. It is set to be released for Windows PC, PlayStation 4, PlayStation 5, Xbox One and Xbox Series X and Series S on April 4, 2023.

References

External links
 

Upcoming video games scheduled for 2023
First-person shooters
Windows games
PlayStation 4 games
PlayStation 5 games
Xbox One games
Xbox Series X and Series S games
Open-world video games
Video games developed in Canada
Post-apocalyptic games
Video game level editors
Video games with user-generated gameplay content
Behaviour Interactive games
Multiplayer and single-player video games